Thomas "T. K." Moore (born February 14, 1945) is a former American football coach. He served as the head football coach at Gardner–Webb University from 1979 to 1982 and The Citadel from 1983 to 1986, compiling a career college football coaching record of 35–49–1.

Head coaching record

References

1945 births
Living people
American football ends
Clemson Tigers football coaches
Gardner–Webb Runnin' Bulldogs football coaches
The Citadel Bulldogs football coaches
The Citadel Bulldogs football players
Wichita State Shockers football coaches
High school football coaches in Colorado
People from Beaver Falls, Pennsylvania
Players of American football from Pennsylvania